Nice Fish is a 2016 play by Mark Rylance, co-written with Louis Jenkins and adapted from poems by the latter. It received its world premiere production at the American Repertory Theater in Cambridge, MA in January 2016, and then transferred to St. Ann's Warehouse, New York, on 14 February 2016, running until 27 March. The production starred Rylance, and was directed by Claire van Kampen.

The production transferred to the Harold Pinter Theatre in London's West End with an official opening night on 25 November 2016, following previews from 15 November. It played a limited run until 11 February 2017. The show received media attention when it was announced that four free tickets would be available at each performance to anyone who dressed up as a fisherman or fish. The play was nominated for the Laurence Olivier Award for Best New Comedy.

An earlier version of the play opened in April 2013 at the Guthrie Theatre in Minneapolis.

References

English-language plays
2016 plays